Hilbrand Pier Anne Nawijn (born 8 August 1948) is a Dutch lawyer and politician of the local political party Lijst Hilbrand Nawijn (LHN) in Zoetermeer.

From 2002 to 2004, he served as a Member of the House of Representatives for the Pim Fortuyn List party and from 2006 for the Party for the Netherlands. During his time in parliament, Nawijn was Minister for Integration  and Asylum Affairs in the first cabinet of Jan Peter Balkenende.

Early life
Nawijn was born in Kampen. The son of a burgemeester (mayor), he is a descendant of Firmin Navin, a French Huguenot who had fled to Holland in 1696 to escape persecution. After graduating Emelwerda College in Emmeloord he studied law at the Rijksuniversiteit Groningen. He later founded his own legal firm Nawijn lawyers in Zoetermeer.

Political career
Following a long career working for the Dutch Ministry of Justice he was elected in 2002 as a member of the Christen-Democratisch Appèl for the municipal council of Zoetermeer. Nawijn was an early supporter of the openly gay, populist Dutch politician Pim Fortuyn and in 2002, when Fortuyn founded the Pim Fortuyn List, Nawijn earned a place on the list. Despite the assassination of Fortuyn by an animal rights activist, which happened days before the election, the LPF emerged with a successful result, thus bringing Nawijn into the Dutch House of Representatives. He was appointed Minister for Integration and Immigration in the first Balkenende cabinet.

Due to the instability of the LPF following Fortuyn's assassination, the first Balkenende cabinet lasted briefly, leading to early elections in 2003. Due to Nawijn's controversial conservative positions such as his support of the death penalty, which horrified many people in the Netherlands and was opposed by the LPF, he was placed at the bottom of the LPF's electoral list. This should have made it almost impossible for Nawijn to be reelected, however, the same statements which made him so unpopular to the political establishment won him a following among voters. On election day Nawijn received enough individual votes to once again enter the House of Representatives. Nawijn also voiced support for the reunification of Flanders and the Netherlands.

Despite still being a member of the LPF, Nawijn often was at odds with the party. In January 2005, he left the fragmented LPF with the goal of founding his own political party which conceptually would lean closer towards the ideas of the far-right Flemish party Vlaams Belang. Together with one of the leaders of Vlaams Belang, Filip Dewinter, in June 2005 he announced the founding of a think tank during a controversial meeting with Dewinter in the former house of murdered politician Pim Fortuyn. Marten Fortuyn, Pim Fortuyn's brother, called this action provocative, and "I had expected otherwise from Nawijn." The influential Dutch magazine Elsevier wrote: "According to (the LPF member of parliament) João Varela (politician), it was widely known that Pim Fortuyn wanted nothing to do with Dewinter, whose party Vlaams Blok (resurrected as Vlaams Belang) had the previous year been forbidden due to racism."

In the Dutch municipal elections of 2006, Nawijn managed, with his own new party, to gather 5 out of 39 seats in his hometown Zoetermeer. Later that year he entered the 2006 Dutch election with a new party, the Partij voor Nederland (Party for the Netherlands), but obtained no seats. During his campaign, Nawijn voiced his support for accepting CIA black sites into the Netherlands in an interview in October 2006 in the Dutch newspaper Spits.

Later career

In early 2007, Nawijn participated in the Dutch version of So You Wanna Be a Popstar?, broadcast by the Dutch commercial TV channel SBS6, granting him fulfilment of one of his dreams. He stated that "Now that I have left national politics, I can do such things. An additional advantage is that it will keep me a bit 'in the picture'". As a result of his performances at the talent contest, which were met with public ridicule, Nawijn signed up for a five-year contract as a singer. His first single came out in May 2007, Hey Jumpen, in the jumpstyle genre, and reached #45 in the Dutch Single Top 100 charts.

In February 2008 he returned to his original career in law.

Since 2010, Nawijn has served as a councilor for his local political party Lijst Hilbrand Nawijn in Zoetermeer. In 2018, while giving a television interview discussing crime and anti-social behaviour in the area, he and the camera crew were attacked by a local gang before police intervened.

References

External links

Official
  Mr. H.P.A. (Hilbrand) Nawijn Parlement & Politiek

 

1948 births
Living people
Christian Democratic Appeal politicians
Dutch Calvinist and Reformed Christians
Dutch corporate directors
Dutch jurists
Dutch management consultants
Dutch people of French descent
Dutch political party founders
Huguenots
Independent politicians in the Netherlands
Leaders of political parties in the Netherlands
Members of the House of Representatives (Netherlands)
Ministers without portfolio of the Netherlands
Municipal councillors in South Holland
People from Kampen, Overijssel
People from Zoetermeer
Party chairs of the Netherlands
Pim Fortuyn List politicians
University of Groningen alumni
20th-century Dutch civil servants
20th-century Dutch lawyers
20th-century Dutch politicians
21st-century Dutch businesspeople
21st-century Dutch lawyers
21st-century Dutch politicians